Robert Robbers (born 3 January 1950) is a retired Dutch rower. He competed at the 1980 Summer Olympics in the quadruple sculls and finished in eights place.

After retiring from competition he became a national rowing coach.

References

1950 births
Living people
Dutch male rowers
Olympic rowers of the Netherlands
Rowers at the 1980 Summer Olympics
People from Balikpapan
Sportspeople from East Kalimantan